Jean Amatucci Fox (born November 23, 1938) is an American politician from New York.

Life
Jean Amatucci was born on November 23, 1938, the daughter of Daniel and Carmela Amatucci. Her father was a Democratic politician, and was the Supervisor of the Town of Bethel who approved the Woodstock Festival, and signed the permits allowing the same. She graduated from State University of New York at Plattsburgh's school nurse-teacher education program in 1960, and became a registered nurse. She lived in White Lake, Sullivan County, New York. She was Executive Director of the New York State School Nurse-Teachers Association, and was active in several other nurses' professional organizations before her election to the State Assembly. She also owned Candy Cone, a soft serve ice cream business, in Bethel during the late 1960s and  early 1970s.

She entered politics as a Democrat, and was elected to the New York State Assembly in 1974, serving as a member of the New York State Assembly from 1975 through 1978, sitting in the 181st and 182nd New York State Legislatures.

In November 1975, she married Mark Dennis Fox, later a United States magistrate judge in the Southern District of New York. On March 14, 1978, their son Michael Louis Fox was born, making her the first woman state legislator in New York history to give birth while in office. In May 1978, she announced her retirement from the Assembly, to take effect at the end of that term, and said that she would take care of her infant son instead.

She was honored as Alumnus of the Year of SUNY Plattsburgh in 1976. She was a member of the College Council of SUNY Plattsburgh from 1976 to 1985.

She was appointed by Governor Mario Cuomo as Chairwoman of the New York State Temporary Commission on Lobbying.

References

1938 births
Living people
People from Sullivan County, New York
Women state legislators in New York (state)
Democratic Party members of the New York State Assembly
State University of New York at Plattsburgh alumni
20th-century American politicians
20th-century American women politicians
21st-century American women